Duplicaria dussumierii, common name Dussumier's auger, is a species of sea snail, a marine gastropod mollusk in the family Terebridae, the auger snails.

Description
The length of the shell varies between 40 mm and 112 mm.

Distribution
This marine species occurs off Indonesia, China, Japan and Korea

References

External links
 

Terebridae
Gastropods described in 1839